Angelo Barbarigo (1350-1418) was a Roman Catholic Cardinal.

References

1350 births
1418 deaths
15th-century Italian cardinals
Angelo